North Yorkshire is a ceremonial county in the North of England. It is mostly located in the Yorkshire and Humber region, but the area around the Tees Valley is in the North East. The largest county in England by land area, it measures  and has a population of 1,158,816 (2021). The county town is Northallerton. 

It consists of the non-metropolitan county of North Yorkshire, which is made up of eleven districts, and four unitary authorities: the City of York, Middlesbrough and Redcar and Cleveland, which are entirely within the county, as well as a portion of Stockon-on-Tees, which is split with County Durham. Until 2023, the non-metropolitan county area is administered by North Yorkshire County Council in a two-tier structure.

It borders three other counties to the south which include the name Yorkshire: West Yorkshire, South Yorkshire and the East Riding of Yorkshire. It also borders Lancashire, Cumbria and County Durham to the north and west. Its eastern border is with the North Sea. The two most populated settlements are Middlesbrough, with a population of 174,700, and York, with a population of 152,841. The most populous settlement in the non-metropolitan county, and third most populated overall, is Harrogate at 73,576. The county has two national parks: the North York Moors and most of the Yorkshire Dales. 

The present county of North Yorkshire is located entirely within the boundaries of historic Yorkshire, its territory split between each of the three ridings of Yorkshire, also including the city of York, which as the county town was not in any of the ridings. North Yorkshire was created in 1974 as part of local government reorganisation and its present boundaries were established upon the abolition of Cleveland in 1996.

History

North Yorkshire was formed on 1 April 1974 as a result of the Local Government Act 1972, and covered most of the lands of the historic North Riding of Yorkshire, as well as northern parts of the West Riding of Yorkshire, northern and eastern East Riding of Yorkshire and the former county borough of York. The new county was governed by North Yorkshire County Council and was wholly within the Yorkshire and the Humber region.

On 1 April 1996, Middlesbrough, Redcar and Cleveland and Stockton borough south of the River Tees became part of the ceremonial county, but not part of the non-metropolitan county governed by North Yorkshire County Council. These areas were and remain within the North East England region. They had been part of the North Riding until 1974, but for twenty-two years from 1974 to 1996 were part of the county of Cleveland.

Also on 1 April 1996, York, rural areas around York, and the town of Haxby were transferred from the non-metropolitan county to become a unitary authority independent of county council authority. The enlarged City of York remained within the ceremonial county.

Geography

The geology of North Yorkshire is closely reflected in its landscape. Within the county are the North York Moors and most of the Yorkshire Dales; two of eleven areas of countryside within England and Wales to be officially designated as national parks. Between the North York Moors in the east and the Pennine Hills in the west lie the Vales of Mowbray and York. The Tees Lowlands lie to the north of the North York Moors and the Vale of Pickering lies to the south. Its eastern border is the North sea coast.

The two major rivers in the county are the River Swale and the River Ure. The Swale and the Ure form the River Ouse which flows through York and into the Humber Estuary. The River Tees forms part of the border between North Yorkshire and County Durham and flows from upper Teesdale through Stockton-on-Tees and Middlesbrough and to the coast. The River Wharfe forms much of the southern border and also flows into the Ouse within the county.

Green belt

North Yorkshire contains a small section of green belt in the south of the county, just north of Ilkley and Otley along the North and West Yorkshire borders. It extends to the east to cover small communities such as Huby, Kirkby Overblow, and Follifoot before covering the gap between the towns of Harrogate and Knaresborough, helping to keep those towns separate.

The belt adjoins the southernmost part of the Yorkshire Dales National Park, and the Nidderdale AONB. It extends into the western area of Selby district, reaching as far as Tadcaster and Balne. The belt was first drawn up from the 1950s.

The city of York has an independent surrounding belt area affording protections to several outlying settlements such as Haxby and Dunnington, and it too extends into the surrounding districts.

Climate
North Yorkshire has a temperate oceanic climate, like most of the UK. However, there are large climate variations within the county. The upper Pennines border on a Subarctic climate, whereas the Vale of Mowbray has an almost Semi-arid climate. Overall, with the county being situated in the east, it receives below-average rainfall for the UK, but the upper Dales of the Pennines are one of the wettest parts of England, where in contrast the driest parts of the Vale of Mowbray are some of the driest areas in the UK.
Summer temperatures are above average, at 22 °C, but highs can regularly reach up to 28 °C, with over 30 °C reached in heat waves. Winter temperatures are below average, with average lows of 1 °C. Snow and Fog can be expected depending on location, with the North York Moors and Pennines having snow lying for an average of between 45 and 75 days per year. Sunshine is most plentiful on the coast, receiving an average of 1650 hours a year, and reduces further west in the county, with the Pennines only receiving 1250 hours a year.

Governance

Local authorities

County council

North Yorkshire County Council governs the non-metropolitan county in a cabinet-style council. The non-metropolitan county excludes the City of York and boroughs of Middlesbrough, Redcar and Cleveland and Stockon-on-Tees. 90 councillors (increased from 72 councillors with effect from the May 2022 election) elect a council leader, who in turn appoints up to 9 councillors to form an executive cabinet. Offices for the county are in County Hall, Northallerton.

In July 2021 the Ministry of Housing, Communities and Local Government announced that in April 2023, the non-metropolitan county will be reorganised into a unitary authority, which will be called North Yorkshire Council. The district councils (Harrogate, Scarborough, Hambleton, Selby, Craven, Richmondshire and Ryedale), are to be abolished and their functions transferred to a single authority. The parts of the county already unitary authorities will not be affected.

Districts

Until April 2023, the county is divided into the local government districts of Craven, Hambleton, Harrogate, Richmondshire, Ryedale, Scarborough and Selby.

Unitary authorities

Parts of the county are administered independently of the county council, having their own unitary authorities: the City of York Council, Redcar and Cleveland Borough Council, Middlesbrough Council and Stockton-on-Tees Borough Council. The latter three are part of the Tees Valley Combined Authority. Uniquely for England, the Borough of Stockton-on-Tees is split between North Yorkshire and County Durham.

In August 2022 the government agreed proposals for a devolution deal, which will require the formation of a combined authority comprising the new unitary North Yorkshire Council and the City of York Council, and election of a directly elected mayor for the combined authority.  The proposals are subject to a public consultation, and anticpate that elections for the first mayor would take place in May 2024.

Economy
In large areas of North Yorkshire, agriculture is the primary source of employment; some 85% of the county is considered to be "rural or super sparse".

Other sectors in 2019 included some manufacturing, the provision of accommodation and meals (primarily for tourists) which accounted for 19 per cent of all jobs and food manufacturing which employed 11 per cent of workers; a few people are involved in forestry and fishing in 2019. The average weekly earnings in 2018 were £531. Some 15% of workers declared themselves as self-employed. One report in late 2020 stated that "North Yorkshire has a relatively healthy and diverse economy which largely mirrors the national picture in terms of productivity and jobs.

Mineral extraction and power generation are also sectors of the economy as is high technology.

Tourism is a significant contributor to the economy. A study of visitors between 2013 and 2015 indicated that the Borough of Scarborough, including Filey, Whitby and parts of the North York Moors National Park, received 1.4m trips per year on average. A 2016 report by the National Park however, states the park area gets 7.93 million visitors annually, generating £647 million and supporting 10,900 full-time equivalent jobs.

The Yorkshire Dales have also attracted many visitors. In 2016, there were 3.8 million visits to the National Park including 0.48 million who stayed at least one night. The parks service estimates that this contributed 
£252 million to the economy and provided 3,583 full-time equivalent jobs. The wider Yorkshire Dales area received 9.7 million visitors who contributed £644 million to the economy. The North York Moors and Yorkshire Dales are among England's best known destinations.

York is a popular tourist destination. A 2014 report, based on 2012 data, stated that York alone receives 6.9 million visitors annually; they contribute £564 million to the economy and support over 19,000 jobs. In the 2017 Condé Nast Traveller survey of readers, York rated 12th among The 15 Best Cities in the UK for visitors. In a 2020 Condé Nast Traveller report, York rated as the sixth best among ten "urban destinations [in the UK] that scored the highest marks when it comes to ... nightlife, restaurants and friendliness".

During February 2020 to January 2021, the average property in North Yorkshire county sold for £240,000, up by £8100 over the previous 12 months. By comparison, the average for England and Wales was £314,000. In certain communities of North Yorkshire, however, house prices were higher than average for the county, as of early 2021: Harrogate (average value: £376,195), Knaresborough (£375,625), Tadcaster (£314,278), Leyburn (£309,165) and Ripon (£299,998), for example.

This is a chart of trend of regional gross value added for North Yorkshire at current basic prices with figures in millions of British pounds sterling.

Effects of the pandemic

Unemployment in the county was traditionally low in recent years, but the lockdowns and travel restrictions necessitated by the COVID-19 pandemic had a negative effect on the economy during much of 2020 and into 2021. The UK government said in early February 2021 that it was planning "unprecedented levels of support to help businesses [in the UK] survive the crisis". A report published on 1 March 2021 stated that the unemployment rate in North Yorkshire had "risen to the highest level in nearly 5 years - with under 25s often bearing the worst of job losses".

York experienced high unemployment during lockdown periods. One analysis (by the York and North Yorkshire Local Enterprise Partnership) predicted in August 2020 that "as many as 13,835 jobs in York will be lost in the scenario considered most likely, taking the city's unemployment rate to 14.5%". Some critics claimed that part of the problem was caused by "over-reliance on the booming tourism industry at the expense of a long-term economic plan". A report in mid June 2020 stated that unemployment had risen 114 per cent over the previous year because of restrictions imposed as a result of the pandemic.

Tourism in the county was expected to increase after the restrictions imposed due the pandemic are relaxed. One reason for the expected increase is the airing of All Creatures Great and Small, a TV series about the vet James Herriot, based on a successful series of books; it was largely filmed within the Yorkshire Dales National Park. The show aired in the UK in September 2020 and in the US in early 2021. One source stated that visits to Yorkshire websites had increased significantly by late September 2020.

Gallery

Transport

Rail

Passenger services on the ECML within the county are operated by London North Eastern Railway, TransPennine Express and Grand Central. TransPennine Express run services on the York to Scarborough Line and the Northallerton–Eaglescliffe Line (for ) that both branch off the ECML.

Northern operates the remaining lines in the county, including commuter services on the Harrogate Line, Airedale Line and York & Selby Lines, of which the former two are covered by the Metro ticketing area. Last but certainly not least, the Settle-Carlisle Line runs through the west of the county, with services again operated by Northern.

The county suffered badly under the Beeching cuts of the 1960s. Notable lines closed were the Scarborough and Whitby Railway, Malton and Driffield Railway and the secondary main line between Northallerton and Harrogate via Ripon.
The medium-term aim is to operate into Northallerton station on the ECML, once an agreement can be reached with Network Rail.

York railway station is the largest station in the county, with 11 platforms and is a major tourist attraction in its own right. The station is immediately adjacent to the National Railway Museum.

Road

The main road through the county is the north–south A1(M), which has gradually been upgraded in sections to motorway status since the early 1990s. The only other motorways within the county are the short A66(M) near Darlington and a small stretch of the M62 motorway close to Eggborough. The other nationally maintained trunk routes are the A168/A19, A64, A66 and A174.

Coach and bus

Long-distance coach services are operated by National Express and Megabus. Local bus service operators include Arriva Yorkshire, Harrogate Bus Company, Scarborough & District (East Yorkshire), Yorkshire Coastliner, First York and the local Dales & District.

Air
There are no major airports in the county itself, but nearby airports include Teesside International (Darlington), Newcastle, Doncaster Sheffield and Leeds Bradford.

Settlements

Map

Settlements and parishes

They are also multiple smaller settlements of North Yorkshire: 
 Acomb, Alne, Ampleforth, Appleton-le-Moors, Appleton Wiske
 Bedale, Bishopthorpe, Bolton, Boroughbridge, Borrowby (Hambleton), Borrowby (Scarborough), Brompton (Hambleton), Brotton, Buckden
 Castleton, Catterick, Catterick Garrison, Cawood, Clapham, Conistone, Copmanthorpe
 Dalton (Hambleton), Dalton (Richmondshire), Danby Wiske, Drax, Dunnington 
 Easby, Easingwold, Egton, Elvington, Eston, Ebberston
 Filey, Flixton, Folkton
 Giggleswick, Gilling East, Gilling West, Glasshouses, Goathland, Grangetown, Grassington, Great Ayton, Grosmont, Guisborough, Ganton, Glaisdale
 Harrogate, Hawes, Haxby, Hebden, Helmsley, High Bentham, Hornton, Hunmanby, Huntington, Hutton Rudby
 Ingleton, Ingleby Arncliffe, Ingleby Barwick, Ingleby Greenhow
 Kettlewell, Kilnsey, Kirkbymoorside, Knaresborough
 Leyburn
 Malham, Malton, Masham, Marske-by-the-Sea, Middleham, Middlesbrough, Middleton, Ryedale, Muston
 New Marske, Normanby, Northallerton, Norton, North Grimston,
 Ormesby, Osmotherley
 Pateley Bridge, Pickering
 Raskelf, Redcar, Reeth, Riccall, Richmond, Rievaulx, Rillington, Ripon, Robin Hood's Bay, Romanby 
 Saltburn, Scagglethorpe, Scampston, Scarborough, Scorton, Selby, Settle, Sherburn, Sheriff Hutton, Shipton, Skelton (Redcar and Cleveland), Skelton (Richmondshire), Skelton (York), Skinningrove, Skipton, Sowerby, Stillington, Stokesley, Streetlam, Sutton, Swinton
 Tadcaster, Teesville, Thirsk, Thornaby
 Westow, Whale Hill, Wheldrake, Whitby, Wintringham
 Yarm, York, Yedingham

Education 

North Yorkshire LEA has a mostly comprehensive education system with 42 state schools secondary (not including sixth form colleges) and 12 independent schools.

Places of interest

News and media
The county is served by BBC Yorkshire and BBC North East and Cumbria. Along the county's coast, Scarborough and Filey receive BBC Yorkshire and Whitby receives BBC North East and Cumbria.

Yorkshire Television and Tyne Tees Television are also received in most areas of the county, Settle and the Western part of the Craven area is served by BBC North West and ITV Granada.
BBC Radio Tees is broadcast to northern parts of the county, whilst BBC Radio York is broadcast more widely. BBC Radio Leeds broadcasts to southern parts of the county.

Sport

Cricket
Yorkshire County Cricket Club play a number of fixtures at North Marine Road, Scarborough and some 2nd XI games in Richmond. The ball game Rock-It-Ball was developed in the county.

Association football

North Yorkshire has a number of association football clubs, including:

Middlesbrough are currently the highest-ranked team in the county as they play in the EFL Championship. In the past, they have won the EFL Cup and reached the UEFA Cup final. Harrogate Town play in the EFL League Two. York City play in the National League. Scarborough Athletic, a phoenix club of Scarborough, play in the National League North. Whitby Town have reached the FA Cup first round seven times and have played the likes of Hull City, Wigan Athletic and Plymouth Argyle; they currently play in the Northern Premier League Premier Division.

Rugby football

The leading rugby union teams in the county include Wharfedale RUFC, Harrogate RUFC, but teams also include Middlesbrough RUFC and Acklam RUFC who play their league games in Regional 2 North, a corresponding league of the same level hosting teams from Teesside, County Durham and Northumberland. York City Knights, previously known as York F.C., are a rugby league team who play in the Rugby League Championships.

Racing

North Yorkshire has multiple racecourses at: Catterick Bridge, Redcar, Ripon, Thirsk and York. It also has one motor racing circuit, Croft Circuit; the circuit holds meetings of the British Touring Car Championship, British Superbike and Pickup Truck Racing race series and one Motorcycle Racing Circuit at Oliver's Mount, Scarborough.

See also
 List of Lords Lieutenant of North Yorkshire
 List of High Sheriffs of North Yorkshire
 North Yorkshire Police
 North Yorkshire Police and Crime Commissioner

Notes

References

External links

 North Yorkshire Lieutenancy
 North Yorkshire County Council
 
 Images of North Yorkshire at the English Heritage Archive

 
Counties of England established in 1974
Non-metropolitan counties
Unitary authority districts of England